The Columbia University Club of New York is a private university alumni club that extends membership to all graduates (and their families) of all the schools and affiliates of Columbia University, as well as Columbia undergraduate students, graduate students, faculty and administrators. The Club has more than 2,500 Columbia members representing all the schools and affiliates of Columbia University.

Members benefit from numerous business and professional opportunities, lectures and social events, and use of the Penn Club of New York City's clubhouse at 30 West 44th Street in Midtown Manhattan, which contains a lounge, business center, library, bar, formal and casual dining rooms, conference and meeting rooms, event rooms, overnight guestrooms, a complete athletic facility, and reciprocal use of various clubs throughout the world.

History
The Columbia University Club was founded in 1901 by recent graduates of Columbia University. The Club had 1,000 members in 1910 and moved to a large clubhouse in Gramercy Park until 1915, when it moved to 4 West 43rd St. It remained there until 1973, when, in need of capital, it sold the building to the Unification Church of the Rev. Sun Myung Moon. It subsequently entered into agreements for its members to use first the Women's National Republican Club, then the Williams Club,  and the Princeton Club of New York, before partnering with the Penn Club in 2017. Due to renewed interest in the Club from Columbia University’s alumni, the Club has experienced significant growth in recent years. As of December 2005, it has over 2,500 members.

Affiliation with Penn Club
As of March 2017, the Columbia University Club operates under an affiliation agreement with the Penn Club, which allows the Columbia University Club to reside and maintain operations at the Penn Club and allows its members full use of the Penn Club's facilities.  The Columbia University Club is administered by its Board of Governors and maintains its own administrative committees, which are separate and distinct from the administration of the Penn Club.

Membership
Membership at the Columbia University Club is open to all alumni (and their families) of all the schools and affiliates of Columbia University, as well as undergraduate students, graduate students, faculty and administrators.

Notable members have included:
 Lee Bollinger, President of Columbia University (2002), President of the University of Michigan, Provost of Dartmouth College, Chair of the Board of Directors of the Federal Reserve Bank of New York, named defendant in U.S. Supreme Court affirmative action cases Grutter v. Bollinger and Gratz v. Bollinger
 Nicholas Murray Butler, Columbia University president (1902-1945), Republican presidential candidate, recipient of the Nobel Peace Prize
 Dwight D. Eisenhower, Columbia University president (1948-1953), United States president (1953-1961)
 Frank Hogan, district attorney of New York County (1924)
 Jack Kerouac, famous beat poet (1950)
 William Barclay Parsons, chief engineer of the first New York City Subway line (1904)
 George Rupp, Columbia University president (1993-2002)
 David Stern, NBA commissioner (1984–2014)

See also
 Cornell Club of New York
 Harvard Club of Boston
 Harvard Club of New York
 List of American gentlemen's clubs
 Penn Club of New York City
 Princeton Club of New York
 Yale Club of New York City

References

External links 
 Columbia Club
 
 Columbia University

Columbia University
Midtown Manhattan
Clubs and societies in New York City